The men's 100 metres event at the 1999 Pan American Games was held July 24–25.

Medalists

Results

Heats
Qualification: First 2 of each heat (Q) and the next 2 fastest (q) qualified for the final.

Wind:Heat 1: +1.6 m/s, Heat 2: -1.0 m/s, Heat 3: -0.5 m/s

Final
Wind: +0.4 m/s

References

Athletics at the 1999 Pan American Games
1999